The Saddam Line consisted of defensive fortifications constructed by Saddam Hussein's Iraqi Army on Kuwait's border with Saudi Arabia after Iraq had invaded and occupied Kuwait in August 1990.

The Western media presented fears that it would present a formidable obstacle to the liberation of Kuwait, consisting of "flame trenches" (ditches filled with oil to be ignited in case of attack) and "sand berms, trench works, tank ditches, barbed wire and minefields", backed by the threat of chemical and biological weapons. The objective of Hussein was to force the coalition to engage in costly Trench warfare. However, those fears turned out to be unwarranted. The coalition assault, beginning at 4 a.m. on February 24, 1991, met "only sporadic resistance", and by 6:45 a.m., troops had broken through the Saddam Line. The US forces charged the Iraqi lines with M1 Abrams tanks modified with minesweeping plows and M728 Combat Engineer Vehicles which buried the trenchlines, and in many cases, buried Iraqi troops alive, the number of which has been estimated to be "in the thousands".

See also

 Trench warfare
 Maginot Line
 Mannerheim Line

References

Fortification lines
Gulf War
1990 establishments in Kuwait